VTM 2 (formerly Q2) is a Belgian television channel owned by the commercial broadcasting company DPG Media.

History 
The channel was originally known as Kanaal 2. However, it has undergone several rebrandings over the years. At launch in 1995, the channel was branded as Ka2 (Dutch pronunciation of K2), then Kanaal 2. In 2001, it was branded KANAALTWEE.
 
On 12 February 2008 the channel changed its name to 2BE, retaining the 2 but referring to the Belgian ISO Country Code BE.

In September 2016, the channel changed its name to Q2. This was an extension of the Qmusic radio station brand owned by Medialaan.

On 31 August 2020, Q2 rebranded as VTM 2, as part of a rebranding of the 4 main DPG channels.

Programming 
Since its parent company also owns VTM (as well as radio channels), it's not uncommon for programs (especially reruns) to be passed on from one channel to another.

Currently aired Imported productions
24 Hours in A&E
Ambulance
American Ninja Warrior
Border Security Australia
Dinner Date
Don't Tell the Bride
Embarrassing Bodies
Escape to the Country
Girlfriends' Guide to Divorce
Home and Away
Keeping Up with the Kardashians
Kitchen Nightmares
Love It or List It
MasterChef Australia
My Kitchen Rules UK
Neighbours
One Born Every Minute
Project Runway
RuPaul's Drag Race
SAS: Who Dares Wins
The Hotel Inspector
The Real Housewives
Worst Cooks in America

Formerly aired Flemish (co-)productions
2BE Games & Chat (interactive daytime television) (former)
AstroContact (phone-in program about astrology)
Benelux' Next Top Model (reality)
Benidorm Bastards (comedy)
Big Brother & its BV (celebrity) version
De Heren Maken de Man (Flemish version of Queer Eye for the Straight Guy)
De Ja of Nee Show (game show/entertainment) 
De Raf & Ronny Show (Flemish sitcom)
Dennis (Flemish sitcom)
En dan nu... reclame 
Expeditie Robinson (reality) (Dutch-Flemish version of Expedition Robinson)
Familie Backeljau (Flemish sitcom)
Foute Vrienden
Honderd Hete Vragen (entertaining 'sex education')
Inbox
M!LF
Open en Bloot (entertaining 'sex education')
Pitstop.TV (motor sports)
Play Today (phone-in quiz show)
Schoon en Meedogenloos (Flemish version of How Clean is Your House?)

Formerly aired Imported productions
24
24: Legacy
7th Heaven
According to Jim
Agents of S.H.I.E.L.D.
American Crime Story
Angel
Arrested Development
Big Wolf on Campus
Black Sails
Black Tie Nights
Bones
Buffy the Vampire Slayer
Burn Notice
Charmed
Chuck
Cold Case
Continuum
Cops
Covert Affairs
Crime Investigation Australia
Damages
Deadliest Catch
Dharma & Greg
Dracula
Dragon Ball Z
Empty Nest
ER 
Everwood
Family Business
Family Guy
Family Matters
Fastlane
Full House
Futurama
Game of Thrones
Gilmore Girls
Glee
Ghosted
Grimm
Hex
Homeland
House
How I Met Your Mother
Jack & Jill
Joey
John Doe
Journeyman
Judge Judy
Kyle XY
Law & Order: Los Angeles
Leverage
Lie to Me
Life in Pieces
Mad Men
Malcolm in the Middle
Max Steel
Merlin
Modern Family
Mr. Robot
Muhteşem Yüzyıl
My Wife and Kids
New Girl
Nip/Tuck
North Shore
One Tree Hill
Operation Repo
Pawn Stars
Point Pleasant
Police Interceptors
Prison Break
Quantico
Raising Hope
Richard Hammond's Crash Course
Rosewood
Royal Pains
Sexcetera
Siren
Six Feet Under
Sleepy Hollow
Smallville
So You Think You Can Dance (U.S.)
Sons of Anarchy
Spartacus
Star Trek: Enterprise
Stargate Atlantis
Stargate SG-1
Still Standing
Strike Back
S.W.A.T.
Terra Nova
That '70s Show
The 4400
The Avengers: Earth's Mightiest Heroes
The Big Bang Theory
The Brave
The Cape
The Closer
The Crossing
The Event
The Fresh Prince of Bel-Air
The Gifted
The Good Guys
The Graham Norton Show
The Middle
The Muppets
The Nanny
The O.C.
The Orville
The Passage
The Practice
The Simpsons
The Sopranos
The Unusuals
The Voice (U.S.)
The Voice UK
The Walking Dead
The West Wing
Top Gear
Touch
Traffic Cops
Transporter: The Series
Tru Calling
Trauma
Two and a Half Men
Two Guys and a Girl
Veronica Mars
Vikings
What I Like About You
Wilfred
Will & Grace
Without a Trace
Women's Murder Club
World's Most Amazing Videos
Xena: Warrior Princess
Yes, Dear

See also 
List of television stations in Belgium

References

External links 
 VTM

Television channels in Flanders
Television channels in Belgium
Television channels and stations established in 1995
Vilvoorde